Agua Dulce Municipality is a municipality in Veracruz, Mexico.

Borders
Agua Dulce Municipality is delimited to the east by Tabasco State, to the south by the El Pesquero River, to the west by the Coatzacoalcos Municipality and the Coatzacoalcos River, and to the north by the Gulf of Mexico.

Products
It produces maize and rice.

References

External links 

  Municipal Official Site
  Municipal Official Information

Municipalities of Veracruz